Desmia pisusalis is a moth in the family Crambidae. It is found in Brazil (Rio de Janeiro).

References

Moths described in 1859
Desmia
Moths of South America